Agallidwipa biramosa is a species of leafhoppers from Madagascar.

References 

Insects described in 2013
Insects of Madagascar
Megophthalminae